Tubulin, gamma complex associated protein 4 is a protein in humans that is encoded by the TUBGCP4 gene.
It is part of the gamma tubulin complex, which required for microtubule nucleation at the centrosome.

See also 
Tubulin
 TUBGCP2
 TUBGCP3
 TUBGCP5
 TUBGCP6

References

Further reading